The Royalty is a 1957 British TV series starring Margaret Lockwood and Hugh Sinclair set in a hotel. Broadcast live, no telerecordings appear to have survived, and the series is believed to be lost.

Cast
Margaret Lockwood as Mollie Miller 
Hugh Sinclair as Richard Manning
Lana Morris as Maisie
Richard Pearson as Fred Potter
Joan Hickson as Miss Plimm

References

External links

The Royalty at Memorable TV

1957 British television series debuts
1950s British drama television series
1958 British television series endings